Mount Helmer is located on the border of Alberta and British Columbia, East of Waitabit Creek and North of Golden. It was named in 1924 after Brigadier-General Richard Alexis Helmer (1864-1920) and his son Alexis Helmer (1892-1915) were killed in battle and was part of the inspiration for In Flanders Fields through his friendship with John McCrae. It is the 194th highest mountain in Alberta and the 355th highest mountain in Canada.

See also
List of peaks on the British Columbia–Alberta border

References

Mountains of Banff National Park
Three-thousanders of Alberta
Three-thousanders of British Columbia
Canadian Rockies